Santa Barbara Tax Products Group is based in San Diego, California and operates as a subsidiary of Green Dot Corporation. Santa Barbara Tax Products Group was established in 2010 upon the sale of the Tax Products Business Unit of Santa Barbara Bank & Trust (SBBT), and was acquired by Green Dot Corporation in 2014.

Santa Barbara Tax Products Group processes tax refund-related financial products on behalf of University National Bank, servicing U.S. taxpayers through partnering tax professionals including Jackson Hewitt Tax Service, and online tax preparation software providers including Turbo Tax.  Santa Barbara Tax Products Group is the second largest provider of tax refund-related products behind H&R Block Bank.

References

External links
 Official website

Financial services companies of the United States